Be Human may refer to:

be Human, a soundtrack in the Ghost in the Shell series
Be Human (album), a 2009 album by rock band Fightstar
Be Human (EP), a 2010 album by Brighten
Be Human (film), a 1936 Betty Boop animated short